Philip Williams, also listed as Pete Williams, was an American baseball third baseman and centerfielder in the Negro leagues.  He played with the Baltimore Black Sox in 1931 and 1932.

References

External links
 and Baseball-Reference Black Baseball stats and Seamheads

Baltimore Black Sox players
Year of birth missing
Year of death missing
Baseball third basemen